Andrea Di Giovanni is an Italian singer-songwriter and pop musician based in London.

Early life and education 
Di Giovanni  was born in Rome on June 25, 1994. Growing up in Italy, the strict environment limited their ability to express their sexuality and identity. They began taking piano lessons at age 3 singing lessons at age 8. Di Giovanni left Christianity at age 17. At age 19, they moved to London and enrolled at the BIMM Institute, where they felt more able to express their queer identity.

Career 
Di Giovanni's debut EP, Permission, was released in May 2019, featuring the lead single "Forbidden Love", which honors Sylvia Rivera and other LGBTQ activists.

Di Giovanni released their debut album, Rebel, on March 26, 2021. The launch was preceded by the release of several singles, including "Stand Up and "Miracle".

Personal life 
Di Giovanni is gender-fluid, and uses he/him, she/her, and they/them.

Discography

Studio albums 

 Rebel (2021)

Extended plays 

 Permission (2019)

References 

Living people
Musicians from Rome
People from London
Italian singer-songwriters
Pop musicians
1994 births
Italian LGBT singers
21st-century LGBT people
Italian emigrants to the United Kingdom
Non-binary musicians
Genderfluid people